Criss Cross Jazz is a Dutch record company and label specializing in jazz.

Criss Cross was established in 1980 by Gerry Teekens, a drummer and German professor. Teekens founded the label after organizing tours for jazz musicians such as Jimmy Raney and Warne Marsh. Early issues included Raney and Marsh, Chet Baker, Pete Christlieb, Stan Getz, Tom Harrell, and Clifford Jordan.

Discography

References

Dutch record labels
Jazz record labels